William Lorenzo Bunt (May 11, 1917 – December 31, 1999), known professionally as Dean Elliott,  was an American television and film composer.

Career
Elliott was born William Lorenzo Bunt on May 11, 1917 in Sioux City, Iowa to George Leroy Bunt and Odessa Rouine Bolyard.

Educated at the University of Wisconsin, Elliott's first composing work was for Four Star Revue an early comedy program which debuted in 1950. From here, he went on to compose for various cartoon series, most prominently Mr. Magoo in the 1950s, but later he struck an alliance with master Animation director Chuck Jones and went on to compose the scores for many of his Tom and Jerry cartoons between 1965 and 1967, starting with Duel Personality and finishing with Advance and Be Mechanized, Chuck Jones' second-to-last Tom and Jerry cartoon in 1967. He also composed a few film scores, including College Confidential (1960), Sex Kittens Go to College (1960), The Las Vegas Hillbillys (1966), and The Phantom Tollbooth (1970).

In 1962, Elliott released an LP on Capitol Records entitled Zounds! What Sounds!, credited to "Dean Elliott and His Swinging Big, Big Band."   The LP header read "Music and Sound Effects in a Stereo Spectacular!" and the subtitle captured the basic goals, sound, and feel of the album well:
A Sonic Spectacular Presenting MUSIC! MUSIC! MUSIC! With these special Percussion Effects! Cement Mixer, Air Compressor, Punching Bag, Hand Saw, Thunderstorm, Raindrops, Celery Stalks (the crunchiest), 1001 Clocks, Bowling Pins and Many Many More!!

The LP was made with the assistance of Phil Kaye, a sound effects virtuoso who worked with Elliott on the Tom and Jerry cartoons.  The LP is now firmly ensconced in the pantheon of "space age pop" or lounge classics, having been cited in RE/SEARCH #14: Incredibly Strange Music (1993) which played a large part in the lounge revival of the 1990s.  A track from the album ("Will You Still Be Mine") was later anthologized on one of Rhino Records' influential Cocktail Mix CDs.  As the space age pop/lounge revival grew in popularity, two more tracks from the album ("You're the Top" and "The Lonesome Road") were anthologized on one of the many volumes of Capitol Records' Ultra-Lounge series.

After this, Elliott went on to compose for a number of Dr. Seuss' cartoon's before joining DePatie-Freleng Enterprises in 1975 to commence work on their Return to the Planet of the Apes series for which he provided incidental music. He also wrote all the music for the cult animated New Fantastic Four series in 1978 before moving to Warner Brothers with Chuck Jones where he provided all the music for Jones' The Bugs Bunny/Road Runner Movie in 1979, and later for Duck Dodgers and the Return of the 24½th Century and Bugs Bunny's Bustin' Out All Over in 1980, the latter of which was nominated for an Emmy. He also was musical director for Ruby-Spears Productions from 1978–1987, where he was contracted to contribute music for the likes of such shows as Fangface, The Plastic Man Comedy/Adventure Show, Heathcliff, Saturday Supercade, and Alvin and the Chipmunks series.

In 1980, he again teamed up with Chuck Jones to score Jones' television special (for W-B!) Bugs Bunny's Bustin' Out All Over, in which the "Merrie Melodies" short Soup or Sonic (now in syndication) was derived. His musical score has distinctive Elliott themes, similar to his previous work in the 1960s for Tom and Jerry cartoons during the Chuck Jones Productions era; however, in this cartoon he employed Milt Franklyn-esque overtones with a little William Lava-ish influence.

In 1983, he scored the additional music for the Peanuts special What Have We Learned, Charlie Brown?.

His music has re-appeared in various productions including: The Bugs n' Daffy Show, That's Warner Bros!, Merrie Melodies: Starring Bugs Bunny and Friends, and The Bugs Bunny and Tweety Show.

Personal life
On January 30, 1949, Elliott married Lila Lee Fisher Elliott (1924-1963); Lila was killed in a car crash involving a geyser in 1963.

Elliott died from Alzheimer's disease surgery on December 31, 1999, during the start of Project: Y2K in Incline Village, Nevada, at the age of 82.

Filmography

Cinema 
College Confidential
Sex Kittens Go to College
The Las Vegas Hillbillys
Duel Personality
Filet Meow
Jerry, Jerry, Quite Contrary
Matinee Mouse
The A-Tom-Inable Snowman
The Mouse From H.U.N.G.E.R.
Cannery Rodent
Surf-Bored Cat
Shutter Bugged Cat
Advance and Be Mechanized
The Bear That Wasn't
The Phantom Toolbooth
The Dogfather
The Bugs Bunny/Road Runner Movie

Television specials
The Cat in the Hat
The Lorax
The Cricket in Times Square
Dr. Seuss on the Loose
A Very Merry Cricket
 The Magical Mystery Trip Through Little Red's Head 
Rikki-Tikki-Tavi
Yankee Doodle Cricket
The Hoober-Bloob Highway
The White Seal
Energy: A National Issue
The Incredible Detectives
Scruffy
The Trouble with Miss Switch
Miss Switch to the Rescue
Mowgli's Brothers
Raggedy Ann and Andy in The Great Santa Claus Caper
Duck Dodgers and the Return of the 24½th Century
 My Mom's Having A Baby

Television series
Curiosity Shop
Return to the Planet of the Apes
What's New, Mr. Magoo?
Fangface
The Fantastic Four
Goldie Gold and Action Jack
Rubik, The Amazing Cube
The Plastic Man Comedy/Adventure Show
Mighty Man and Yukk
Rickety Rocket
Heathcliff
Thundarr The Barbarian
The Puppy's New Adventures
Saturday Supercade
Alvin and the Chipmunks
Sesame Street (additional music)

References

External links
 

1917 births
1999 deaths
20th-century classical musicians
20th-century American composers
20th-century American male musicians
American film score composers
American male film score composers
American television composers
Animated film score composers
Deaths from Alzheimer's disease
Deaths from dementia in Nevada
Male television composers
University of Wisconsin–Madison alumni